Orders of battle of the Union and Confederate forces at the Battle of New Bern, 14 March 1862.

Military Rank Abbreviations Used
 BG = Brigadier General
 Col = Colonel
 Ltc = Lieutenant Colonel
 Maj = Major
 Cpt = Captain
 Lt = Lieutenant

Union Army

Department of North Carolina "Coast Division of the US Army"

BG Ambrose E. Burnside

Union Navy

Confederate Army

Notes

American Civil War orders of battle